Boris Olegovich Gorovoy (born 8 April 1974) is a Belarusian professional football coach and a former player. He is an assistant manager of Russian club Dynamo St. Petersburg.

Club career
He made his professional debut in the Soviet Second League in 1991 for FC Torpedo Taganrog.

Referee career
Between 2006 and 2009 he worked as a referee in Russian Second Division.

Honours
MPKC Mozyr
Belarusian Premier League champion: 1996
Belarusian Cup winner: 1995–96

Zenit Saint Petersburg
 Russian Cup winner: 1998–99

European club competitions
With FC Zenit St. Petersburg.

 UEFA Intertoto Cup 2000: 7 games.
 UEFA Cup 2002–03: 4 games.

References

1974 births
Sportspeople from Taganrog
Living people
Soviet footballers
Belarusian footballers
Belarusian expatriate footballers
Belarus international footballers
Russian Premier League players
Belarusian Premier League players
Ukrainian Premier League players
FC Zenit Saint Petersburg players
FC Moscow players
FC Metalurh Zaporizhzhia players
Belarusian football referees
Expatriate footballers in Ukraine
Belarusian expatriate sportspeople in Ukraine
FC Volgar Astrakhan players
Expatriate footballers in Russia
Belarusian expatriate sportspeople in Russia
FC Rechitsa-2014 players
FC Slavia Mozyr players
FC Torpedo Minsk players
FC Taganrog players
Association football midfielders
Belarusian football managers
Belarusian expatriate football managers
Expatriate football managers in Russia
FC Dynamo Saint Petersburg managers